Special Ops Mission is an American reality television series that premiered on August 13, 2009 on the Military Channel (now American Heroes Channel). The program features former United States Army Ranger and Air Force Pararescueman Wil Willis, who performs solo special operations missions against groups of opposing-force (OPFOR) operatives, which consists of regular and special operations veterans in a simulated wargame mission.

Plot
At the beginning of each episode, Wil Willis, call sign Whiskey Whiskey, is given information on a specific special operations mission by U.S. Marine Corps Master Sergeant Tom Minder or U.S. Army Sergeant Matt Anderson, which he must complete solo. It is Willis' call as to how he wishes to infiltrate, collect intelligence, complete objectives, and how he will deal with the OPFOR (opposing force). The OPFOR are then introduced, with backgrounds and call signs given. Both parties separately discuss plans, though neither side is told how many enemies they will face. Equipment and weapons are introduced, which typically consists of M4 carbines and M16 rifles loaded with Simunition rounds. It is predetermined that a simulated hit to the torso is a kill shot, while a hit to an extremity only wounds.

Willis also carries a variety of other equipment to cover mission variables such as environment (weather and terrain), expected resistance, and infiltration/exfiltration plans. Digital cameras for intelligence gathering, a remote-controlled 2 wheeled surveillance robot equipped with a night vision camera for scouting ahead, and body armor are just some examples of what he uses. Likewise, the OPFOR may have access to special equipment of their own, such as motor vehicles, various grenades, and early detection gear.

Episodes

Reviews
Mike Hale of The New York Times offers suspicion regarding the realism of the program. Viewer response, on the other hand, has been primarily positive, and  the show had an average rating of 5/5 on the iTunes Store.

References

External links

American military television series
American Heroes Channel original programming
2009 American television series debuts
2009 American television series endings